Karen Elva Zerby (born July 31, 1946) is the leader of The Family International, originally known as the Children of God. She is also called Maria, Mama Maria, Maria David, Maria Fontaine, and Queen Maria.

Biography
Zerby was raised in evangelical Pentecostalism. Her father was a Nazarene minister, and she is credited with bringing the "fundamental Pentecostal principle of being 'Spirit-led'" into the movement she eventually came to lead. 

She joined the group, then called Teens for Christ, in 1969. Trained as a stenographer, she became the personal secretary to David Berg, the group's founder, and was instrumental in transcribing his classes. He later separated from his first wife, Jane, and Zerby became his wife. Berg openly explained this to his followers via a missive called "The Old Church and the New Church".

By the mid-1980s, Zerby began to issue religious edicts of her own: following allegations of sexual abuse within the organization, she forbade sexual activity in 1984 for new members until they had been in the group for six months and in that same year began the taping of cassettes with music, which provided an additional source of income. In 1986, she forbade sexual contact between adults and minors; later, it became an offense that could lead to excommunication. Throughout the 1980s, she dictated and enforced elements of discipline, ending, for instance, a training program for children she deemed too harsh. With David Berg's health declining in the late 1980s, Zerby essentially took over the leadership position in 1988. After Berg's death in 1994, she married Steven Kelly, another group leader, and assumed the spiritual leadership of the group.

Child abuse controversies
In 1975, while living in Tenerife, Spain, Zerby had a son, Ricky Rodriguez, who was to "guide them all when the End Times came". Rodriguez's childhood (Berg was his stepfather) was recorded in a book called The Story of Davidito, which was meant to be an example to other members on how to raise their children. The book is controversial for its encouragement of child sexual abuse. According to the book, Zerby participated in the alleged sexual abuse of her son, alongside David Berg, from the time he was 18 months old, and allowed her seven-year-old daughter Christina to be raised in a similar manner. During this period, the group's leadership, including Zerby, were highly secretive, living in remote locations and being barely seen by anyone. Zerby was known to the group's followers mostly from cartoons in the group's internal publications until 2005 when recent photos of her were released online.

In January 2005, Rodriguez murdered former group member Angela Smith, a former nanny; hours later, Rodriguez committed suicide. In a video recorded the night before, "he said he saw himself as a vigilante avenging children like him and his sisters who had been subject to rapes and beatings". Apparently, he had been looking for his mother and sister: "He wanted to see his mother prosecuted for child abuse, and to free Techi from the group".

References

External links
Karen Zerby  official website
xFamily.org Publications Database  contains most of the copyrighted writings by Karen Zerby, Steven Kelly, and David Berg

1946 births
Living people
Members of The Family International
Cult leaders
Female religious leaders
People from Camden, New Jersey